Oakhaven may refer to:

Oakhaven, Arkansas
Oakhaven, Massachusetts. a fictional suburb of Salem in Scooby-Doo! and the Witch's Ghost 
Oakhaven, New York, a community built in East Islip, New York